Kalihati is a town of Kalihati Upazila, Tangail, Bangladesh. The town is situated 22 km northeast of Tangail city and 102 km northwest of Dhaka city, the capital of Bangladesh.

Demographics
According to Population Census 2011 performed by Bangladesh Bureau of Statistics, The total population of Kalihati town is 37,038. There are 8731 households in total.

Education
The literacy rate of Kalihati town is 53.4% (Male-58.4%, Female-48.3%).

See also
 Mirzapur, Bangladesh
 Dhanbari

References

Populated places in Tangail District
Pourashavas of Bangladesh